Boulting v Association of Cinematograph, Television and Allied Technicians [1963] 2 QB 606 is a UK labour law and UK company law case from the Court of Appeal. It covers the issue of what it means to act in the best interests of the company, relevant under section 172 of the Companies Act 2006.

Facts
Two managing directors of a film company, John and Roy Boulting, applied for a declaration that while they were performing 'management functions' (e.g. producing and directing) they were not eligible for membership of the Association of Cinematograph, Television and Allied Technicians, a trade union (the ACTAT). Until 1950 they had been union members, but then they tore up their cards and paid no further subscriptions. In 1959 the union claimed that they needed to pay up to date for their membership fees, and said they must be members of the union.

At this time, like many unions, there was a closed shop agreement. Rule 7 of the union's rules said that "The association shall consist of all employees engaged on the technical side of film production... including film directors." They also wanted an injunction restraining the union from making them join.

Judgment
A majority Court of Appeal held that there was no principle which prevented every employee from becoming union members. Lord Justices Upjohn and Diplock held, firstly, there was nothing ultra vires about rule 7. Secondly, the fiduciary rule that one should not put oneself in a position of conflict of interest was aimed to protect the principal (in this case the company the managing directors worked for) not the agent (the managing directors). So they could not rely on this argument as a way to shield themselves. And thirdly, there was no conflict of interest anyway between being a union member and a manager. However, they said a court is entitled to grant an injunction against a trade union to prevent an injury which is not "alleged to have been committed" notwithstanding the Trade Disputes Act 1906 s.4(1).

Lord Denning MR dissented. He argued that the word "employee" in rule 7 did not include managers. Even if it did, it would be unlawful to force managers to become union members unless provision was made for possible conflicts of interest.

Lord Denning also famously commented on the position of "nominee" directors. He expressed the view that there is nothing wrong with a director being nominated by a particular shareholder to represent his interests "...so long as the director is left free to exercise his best judgment in the interests of the company which he serves. But if he is put upon terms that he is bound to act in the affairs of the company in accordance with the directions of his patron, it is beyond doubt unlawful".

See also
Directors' duties
Judgment of the European Court of Justice of 27 June 1996. P. H. Asscher v Staatssecretaris van Financiën. Reference for a preliminary ruling: Hoge Raad - Netherlands. Article 52 of the EC Treaty - Requirement of equal treatment - Income tax on non-residents. Case C-107/94.

Notes

United Kingdom company case law
United Kingdom labour case law
Lord Denning cases
1963 in British law
Court of Appeal (England and Wales) cases
1963 in case law
United Kingdom trade union case law